Following is a list of dams and reservoirs in Delaware.

Dams and reservoirs in Delaware

Bellevue Lake
 Edgar M. Hoopes Dam, Hoopes Reservoir, City of Wilmington, Delaware
 multiple dams, Newark Reservoir, City of Newark, Delaware
 Cubbage Pond, a reservoir on Cedar Creek in Sussex County, Delaware

References 

 
 
Delaware
Dams
Dams